Heaven Only Knows is the seventh album by R&B crooner Teddy Pendergrass. It was his final studio album for Philadelphia International, released just after he left the label to record for Asylum Records. It produced one single, "I Want My Baby Back," which reached #61 on the Billboard charts in 1984.

Track listing
"Crazy About Your Love" (Bobby Womack, Kenny Gamble, Leon Huff)
"Judge for Yourself" (Dexter Wansel, Cynthia Biggs)
"I Want My Baby Back" (Womack, Gamble)
"Life Is for Living" (Frank Prescott, Michael Burton, Phil Terry)
"You and Me for Right Now" (Victor Carstarphen, Gene McFadden, John Whitehead)
"Just Because You're Mine" (Gene McFadden, John Whitehead)
"Heaven Only Knows" (LeRoy Bell, Casey James)
"Don't Ever Stop (Giving Your Love to Me)" (Gamble, Huff)

References

1983 albums
Teddy Pendergrass albums
Albums produced by Kenneth Gamble
Albums produced by Leon Huff
Albums produced by Thom Bell
Philadelphia International Records albums
Albums recorded at Sigma Sound Studios